This is a list of states that have signed and ratified or acceded to the Ottawa Treaty (also known as the Mine Ban Treaty). The treaty, which outlaws anti-personnel mines, was opened for signature on December 3, 1997. Canada, Ireland, and Mauritius became the first states to ratify the treaty that same day. The treaty came into force and closed for signature on March 1, 1999 with the ratification by 40 states. Since then, states that did not sign the treaty can now only accede to it. Currently, 164 states have ratified or acceded to the treaty, and one state (Marshall Islands) had signed the treaty but not ratified it.

States parties
The following 164 states have either signed and ratified or acceded to the treaty.

Signatory states
The following state has signed but not ratified the treaty.

Non-signatory states

See also 

 List of parties to the Biological Weapons Convention
 List of parties to the Chemical Weapons Convention
 List of parties to the Convention on Certain Conventional Weapons
 List of parties to the Comprehensive Nuclear-Test-Ban Treaty
 List of parties to the Partial Nuclear Test Ban Treaty
 List of parties to the Treaty on the Non-Proliferation of Nuclear Weapons
 List of parties to the Treaty on the Prohibition of Nuclear Weapons

References

Mine action
Lists of parties to treaties